In enzymology, a 3-aci-nitropropanoate oxidase is an enzyme that catalyzes the chemical reaction

3-aci-nitropropanoate + O2 + H2O  3-oxopropanoate + nitrite + H2O2

The 3 substrates of this enzyme are 3-aci-nitropropanoate, O2, and H2O, whereas its 3 products are 3-oxopropanoate, nitrite, and H2O2.

This enzyme belongs to the family of oxidoreductases, specifically those acting on other nitrogenous compounds as donors with oxygen as acceptor.  The systematic name of this enzyme class is 3-aci-nitropropanoate:oxygen oxidoreductase. This enzyme is also called propionate-3-nitronate oxidase.  It employs one cofactor, FMN.

References

External links
 

EC 1.7.3
Flavoproteins
Enzymes of unknown structure